Edward Loring Flynn (October 25, 1909 – February 7, 1976) was an American boxer who won the gold medal in the 1932 Summer Olympics as a welterweight. He was also a member of the Loyola Wolf Pack boxing team.

He was born in New Orleans and died in Tampa, Florida.

Amateur career
Flynn was the U.S. amateur champion in both 1931 and 1932. In 1932, he won the gold medal in the welterweight class after winning the final against Erich Campe.

Post-Olympics
After his gold medal in Los Angeles, he fought professionally, compiling a record of 14-1. Flynn was drafted into the armed services in 1935, remaining in uniform until the end of World War II. He graduated from Loyola's dental school and is listed as "Dr. Eddie Flynn" as a member of the Greater New Orleans Sports Hall of Fame.

1932 Olympic results
Below are the boxing results of Edward Flynn who represented the United States in the welterweight division at the 1932 Los Angeles Olympics:

 Round of 16: defeated Luis Sardella (Argentina) on points
 Quarterfinal: defeated Dick Barton (South Africa) on points
 Semifinal: defeated Dave McCleave (Great Britain) on points
 Final: defeated Erich Campe (Germany) on points (won gold medal)

References

 
 
 1932 Loyola Wolf Yearbook
 Loyola Hall of Fame
 Greater New Orleans Hall of Fame
 Florida Sports Hall of Fame
 Florida Boxing Hall of Fame

1909 births
1976 deaths
Boxers from Louisiana
Welterweight boxers
Olympic boxers of the United States
Boxers at the 1932 Summer Olympics
Olympic gold medalists for the United States in boxing
Medalists at the 1932 Summer Olympics
Sportspeople from New Orleans
American male boxers